The legislative districts of San Jose del Monte are the representations of the component city of San Jose del Monte in the Congress of the Philippines. The city is currently represented in the lower house of the Congress through its lone congressional district.

History 
San Jose del Monte was represented as part of Bulacan's at-large district in the Malolos Congress (1898–1899) and the National Assembly of the Second Philippine Republic (1943–1944) and the second district from 1907 to 1941 and from 1945 to 1972. The province of Bulacan was represented in the Interim Batasang Pambansa as part of Region III from 1978 to 1984, and elected four representatives at-large to the Regular Batasang Pambansa in 1984.

San Jose del Monte was placed in the fourth district of Bulacan after the reorganization of the province's legislative districts under the new Constitution which took effect on February 7, 1987. San Jose del Monte, which became a city in 2000, was separated from the fourth district of Bulacan on December 18, 2003 by virtue of Republic Act No. 9230 which amended the city charter (Republic Act No. 8797) authored by then Congressman Angelito Sarmiento, and elected its own representative starting in the 2004 elections. However, the city's residents still vote as part of the province's 4th Sangguniang Panlalawigan district for the purpose of electing Provincial Board members.

Lone District

See also 
Legislative districts of Bulacan

References 

San Jose del Monte
Politics of San Jose del Monte